The steam locomotives of DRG Class 34.73, formerly the Mecklenburg Class P 3.1 were passenger train locomotives operated by the Grand Duchy of Mecklenburg Friedrich-Franz Railway and were based on the Prussian P 3.1. They were sometimes used in express train services to begin with. Of the 41 examples belonging to this administration, which were built between 1888 and 1908, two originally came from the Lloyd Railway (Neustrelitz-Warnemünde). One improvement over the Mecklenburg P 2 was the braked coupled axle.

Twenty two of these locomotives were taken over by the Deutsche Reichsbahn, where they were given the running numbers 34 7301–34 7308 and 34 7351–34 7364. These engines were exclusively vehicles from the Friedrich-Franz Railway.

The engines were equipped with Prussian tenders of Class pr 3 T 10.5.

See also
Grand Duchy of Mecklenburg Friedrich-Franz Railway 
List of Mecklenburg locomotives

References 

 
 
 

2-4-0 locomotives
P03.1
Standard gauge locomotives of Germany
Railway locomotives introduced in 1888
1B n2 locomotives
Passenger locomotives